Pablo Miller  (born 1960) is a former British diplomat and soldier who was first secretary of the British embassy in Estonia from 1997. In 2002 he was given the Order of the White Star, 3rd Class by the President of Estonia Arnold Rüütel. He was appointed to the Order of the British Empire in 2015 for service to British foreign policy.

Russian intelligence claims that Miller was a senior officer in British intelligence who worked undercover as a first secretary of the British embassy in Tallinn, Estonia. While working at the British embassy, Miller recruited Sergei Skripal to work for the British as a double-agent.

Miller was a member of the Royal Tank Regiment and the Royal Green Jackets in the British army. He joined the Foreign and Commonwealth Office in 1990. He worked in Nigeria before moving to Estonia.

Miller worked for Christopher Steele's London-based private intelligence firm, Orbis Business Intelligence, which produced the Steele dossier.

References

British diplomats
Living people
Officers of the Order of the British Empire
Recipients of the Order of the White Star, 3rd Class
1960 births